Eiffel Bridge (also known as "Great Bridge") was a steel bridge located in Zrenjanin, Serbia. It crossed the Begej river and was built at the same time as the Small bridge.

History 
The first Great Bridge was made of wood. It was a bascule bridge, built in 1807. In 1903, city authorities granted an order for a new, steel bridge, according to the popular belief, to Gustave Eiffel's company in Paris. The old wooden bridge was removed and construction work started in late 1903. In the spring of 1904, the new Great Bridge was finished. It was officially named "Erzsébeth-híd" / "Elisabeth Brücke" (Elisabeth Bridge), after the late Austro-Hungarian empress Elisabeth.

The Great Bridge represented the most prominent example of Secession style bridges in Vojvodina. Functional and artistically valuable at the same time, the bridge was equipped with a system of levers that could raise its level for approximately 2 meters. The arcs of the bridge were backed by monumental columns decorated with geometrical and floral motifs. It connected Trg Zorana Đinđića (Zoran Đinđić Square) and Žitni trg (Wheat Square).

After World War I, the new authorities renamed the bridge "Dositejev most" (Доситејев мост), after Dositej Obradović.

Removal 
During the 1960s, local authorities tried many times to remove the bridge. Finally, in 1969, they removed it because of, as told, "new urbanistic plans". The bridge was cut into pieces and replaced with a new, concrete bridge.

Today 
At the place of the former Eiffel Bridge there is now a concrete pedestrian bridge, built in 1971. Some ornaments of the former bridge can still be seen within the area of the "Begej" shipyard. Memory of the famous bridge is retained in a song "Bečkerečka ćuprija" ("The Bridge of Bečkerek") from the early 20th century, where it is said that the bridge is "as tight as a box". "Four fat horses" mentioned in the song are depicted on a mural at the main city's boulevard.

In 2008 town authorities planned to reconstruct the bridge, but the project was denied by the Center for Preservation of Monuments of Culture because it was inadequate.  Reconstruction of the bridge would demand vast corresponding changes in the surrounding area due to dramatic changes after the second world war.

See also
Zrenjanin
There is also another bridge project by Gustav Eiffel that shares the same name in Viana do Castelo, Portugal.

References 
Re-construction of Eiffel Bridge in 2008 (in Serbian)

External links 
 Removing the bridge

Zrenjanin
Buildings and structures in Vojvodina